Rope bondage, also referred to as rope play, kinbaku, shibari or fesselspiele, is bondage involving the use of rope to restrict movement, wrap, suspend, or restrain a person, as part of BDSM activities. Japanese bondage is the most publicly visible style of rope bondage. An alternative style, "Western bondage" is about achieving restraint; the Japanese style is more concerned with the artistry of the process. String bondage is the wrapping of rows of string around a body area for arousal.  String bondage is also known as constrictions.

History
Rope bondage derives from the erotic Japanese bondage art form of shibari, which was in turn developed from the now-defunct Japanese military restraint technique of hojōjutsu. The rope dress is not of itself a form of restraint, but is used either by itself as an adornment, or incorporated into restraining bondage.

Materials
Bondage ropes used come in a variety of materials and length. Japanese bondage traditionally uses natural fibers such as hemp and jute which are cut into approximately  lengths. Western-style bondage typically uses longer ropes that span a wider variety of materials.
 Ropes (typically of a nylon or cotton variety)
 Household furniture

Technique

Spreadeagle position 
A four-poster bed is sometimes used to hold the subject in a spreadeagle position. The wrists and ankles are tied to the bed's vertical columns, thus restraining the arms and legs.

X-cross 

The X-cross is shaped like the letter 'X'.  The points of each section act as anchor points for restraining the arms and legs.

Chair tie 

A chair tie is a form of furniture bondage, a bondage technique which has multiple forms. It typically places the subject in a chair with wrists bound to the arm rests of the chair or bound behind the subject's back and behind the back rest. The subject's ankles are generally tied to the legs of the chair, and additional ropes are sometimes used to keep the subject fully secure. A chair tie is occasionally combined with suspension bondage.

Suspension bondage

Hogtie 

The subject is restrained at the wrists and ankles with all four joints converging together while the subject rests on either their back or (more commonly) stomach.

See also

 Bondage positions and methods
 Human furniture

References 

BDSM terminology
Decorative ropework